The 2004–05 season was Blackpool F.C.'s 97th season (94th consecutive) in the Football League. It was also their fourth consecutive season in the third tier of English football. They finished in sixteenth place.

Scott Taylor was the club's top scorer for the second consecutive season, with fourteen goals (twelve in the league, one in the FA Cup and one in the League Cup).

It was Colin Hendry's first season as manager.

Table

References

Blackpool F.C. seasons
Blackpool